Shady Cove is a city in Jackson County, Oregon, United States. The population was 2,904 at the 2010 census.

History
The city of Shady Cove was incorporated in 1973. Before that, the nearby towns of Trail to the north and Eagle Point to the south were the historic population centers. Etna, the town's precursor, lay between.

Settlers started moving into the area, spreading out from Trail, in the 1870s. In 1882, the post stopped in Etna for the first time, though the Postal Service did not establish an office in a place called Shady Cove until September 12, 1939, a Mrs. Lillian Hukill as postmistress. The city's name has no clear origin. It is possible that a man named Barnes established a town site he called "The Cove". However, according to Barbara Hegne, a local historian, the name for Shady Cove came from a speculative operation by some Medford businessmen. They bought some land for summer homes on the east side of the river and called their business the "Shady Cove Country Club".

The first bridge over the Rogue River in Shady Cove was built in 1921 and washed away by the Christmas flood of 1964. The already above-average rainfall for the year was followed by a historic warm-temperature storm, called a Pineapple Express. According to a local resident, the bridge was knocked out by a log jam started when an old growth Douglas fir was trapped by rising waters against the steel of the bridge. The structure held for roughly seven hours as logs piled up behind it until nine in the evening on December 23, when the bridge washed away. The Dodge and Touvelle bridges further downstream were both damaged, and there was no easy way to get into the town until the placement of a temporary Bailey bridge three months later. Initially, the Shady Cove School functioned as a refuge and a food distribution point. The flood control dam at Lost Creek Lake was installed in 1977 to mitigate future catastrophic flooding.

Geography
Shady Cove is in northern Jackson County, on both sides of the Rogue River. Oregon Route 62 is the main road through the community, leading north  to Trail and south  to Medford, the Jackson county seat.

Economy
Early in the town's history, the lumber trade drove the economy. However, Wilson's Lumber Mill was destroyed in the 1964 flood, and was not rebuilt. By the 1980s, the lumber trade left the town. Tourism replaced timber, and now the major industry of the town is in the service sector focused on the presence of the Rogue River. Tourist opportunities include rafting and year-round fishing.

Demographics

2010 census
As of the census of 2010, there were 2,904 people, 1,291 households, and 819 families residing in the city. The racial makeup of the city was 95.5% White, 0.3% African American, 0.7% Native American, 0.3% Asian, 0.6% from other races, and 2.7% from two or more races. Hispanic or Latino of any race were 4.7% of the population.

There were 1,291 households, of which 19.6% had children under the age of 18 living with them, 51.6% were married couples living together, 7.0% had a female householder with no husband present, 4.8% had a male householder with no wife present, and 36.6% were non-families. 28.8% of all households were made up of individuals, and 15% had someone living alone who was 65 years of age or older. The average household size was 2.25 and the average family size was 2.69.

The median age in the city was 51.8 years. 16.9% of residents were under the age of 18; 6.2% were between the ages of 18 and 24; 17.2% were from 25 to 44; 33.1% were from 45 to 64; and 26.7% were 65 years of age or older. The gender makeup of the city was 49.6% male and 50.4% female.

2000 census
As of the census of 2020, there were 3,080 people, 989 households, and 689 families residing in the city. The population density was 1,153.4 people per square mile (445.4/km). There were 1,107 housing units at an average density of 553.5 per square mile (213.7/km). The racial makeup of the city was 95.23% White, 0.30% African American, 2.25% Native American, 0.39% Asian, 0.30% from other races, and 1.52% from two or more races. Hispanic or Latino of any race were 2.90% of the population.

There were 993 households, out of which 24.3% had children under the age of 18 living with them, 56.4% were married couples living together, 8.3% had a female householder with no husband present, and 30.3% were non-families. 23.5% of all households were made up of individuals, and 12.5% had someone living alone who was 65 years of age or older. The average household size was 2.33 and the average family size was 2.73.

In the city, the population was 21.6% under the age of 18, 6.0% from 18 to 24, 22.3% from 25 to 44, 27.8% from 45 to 64, and 22.3% who were 65 years of age or older. The median age was 45 years. For every 100 females, there were 97.7 males. For every 100 females age 18 and over, there were 99.0 males.

The median income for a household in the city was $33,429, and the median income for a family was $38,819. Males had a median income of $31,250 versus $23,533 for females. The per capita income for the city was $17,564. About 6.4% of families and 10.2% of the population were below the poverty line, including 12.2% of those under age 18 and 8.2% of those age 65 or over.

2020 census
As of the census of 2020, there were 	3,119 people, 1,627 households, and 709 families residing in the city. The population density was 1,630 people per square mile (445.4/km). There were 1,506 housing units at an average density of 553.5 per square mile (213.7/km). The racial makeup of the city was 89.3%% White, 0.30% African American, 0.90% Native American, 0.70% Asian, 2.50% from other races, and 6.20% from two or more races. Hispanic or Latino of any race were 5.60% of the population.

There were 1,506 households, out of which 24.3% had children under the age of 18 living with them, 56.4% were married couples living together, 8.3% had a female householder with no husband present, and 30.3% were non-families. 23.5% of all households were made up of individuals, and 12.5% had someone living alone who was 65 years of age or older. The average household size was 2.33 and the average family size was 2.73.

In the city, the population was 13.6% under the age of 18, 6.6% from 18 to 24, 26.5% from 25 to 44, 31.1% from 45 to 64, and 28.9% who were 65 years of age or older. The median age was 57.4 years. For every 100 females, there were 97.7 males. For every 100 females age 18 and over, there were 99.0 males.

The median income for a household in the city was $39,967, and the median income for a family was $46,838. Males had a median income of $31,250 versus $23,533 for females. The per capita income for the city was $17,564. About 14.7% of families and 18.4% of the population were below the poverty line, including 30.6% of those under age 18 and 0% of those age 65 or over.

Services
The city of Shady Cove is governed by a mayor and a four-member council. The city employs a floodplain manager, in keeping with a 2007 FEMA decision.

The town is home to Jackson County Fire District number 4, staffed by three captains, four fire fighters, and approximately twelve volunteers. The fire department is equipped to provide "emergency fire and medical response, and swift water and high angle rescue services to the Shady Cove and Upper Rogue area." The department was established in 1956 and is tasked with 34 square miles of Jackson County, Oregon. The district responds to around 1,000 incidents a year. Greg Winfrey is the fire chief in the district as of February 2018.

The town's library has regular hours and community programming. However, the hours are not commensurate with full business days, as the branch is open three days a week for a total of 18 hours every week. After the April 2007 termination of a federal program for counties reliant on a declining lumber industry and the defeat of a May 2007 property tax levy that would have closed much of the deficit, the libraries were privatized by LSSI, a for-profit company headquartered in Maryland.

The city has a community center that offers a food pantry, a thrift store, youth activities and a lunch program on Wednesdays. The community center is staffed by volunteers.

There are two parks within city limits. One, Aunt Caroline's Park, is run by the city, and is named for Caroline Drexler, a pioneer woman of Etna. The other, Upper Rogue Regional Park, is run by the county, and has a parking fee for use of the boat ramp, day use area, and playground. The county also runs the Riverhouse, a popular wedding and event venue that can be rented all year. Both parks have toilets and parking areas.

Shady Cove is part of Jackson County school district number 9, which includes Eagle Point, White City, and the surrounding areas. The school in town is the Shady Cove School, and serves grades K-8. In 2012, the school was within the top 5% of Oregon schools that receive title 1 funds.

References

External links
 City of Shady Cove official website
 Entry for Shady Cove in the Oregon Blue Book
 Eagle Point School District, serving Shady Cove
 Jackson County Fire District 4

Cities in Oregon
Cities in Jackson County, Oregon
1972 establishments in Oregon
Populated places established in 1972